Xu Yifan (born 8 August 1988) is a professional tennis player from China. She reached a career-high ranking of No. 148 in singles, on 13 July 2015. Since October 2018, she has specialized playing in doubles. On 13 January 2020, she peaked at No. 7 in the WTA doubles rankings.

Career
Xu made her debut playing on the ITF Women's Circuit in China. She won her first doubles title with Xia Huan in 2006. She was a finalist in women's doubles at the 2008 China Open in Beijing.

2014–2016: Australian Open semifinalist
She was a quarterfinalist at the 2014 US Open in women's doubles with Zarina Diyas. 

She reached the semifinals at the 2016 Australian Open and was a quarterfinalist at the 2016 French Open in women's doubles with Zheng Saisai.

2017–2019: Major final and semifinal at Wimbledon, five quarterfinals
She was also a quarterfinalist in doubles at the Australian Open in 2017 with Raquel Atawo. In 2017, she formed a new partnership with Canadian Gabriela Dabrowski. Xu won the Miami Open and the Connecticut Open women's doubles with Dabrowski. She partnered with Dabrowski again in the US Open, with the pair reaching the quarterfinals.

In 2018, the duo won the doubles competition at the Sydney International, and then reached the quarterfinals in Melbourne, just like 2019 at the French Open and US Open. The biggest achievement of the Canadian/Chinese pair was reaching the final of the 2019 Wimbledon Championships.

2020: US Open and WTA 1000 finals, world No. 7 in doubles
She reached the finals of the Western & Southern Open in Cincinnati and the US Open with Nicole Melichar.

2021–2022: Olympics, second WTA 1000 title, French Open quarterfinal
In Indian Wells, she won her second WTA 1000 title of her career in doubles with Yang Zhaoxuan.

She qualified for her fourth 2022 WTA Finals with a different partner compatriot Yang Zhaoxuan.

Performance timeline

Doubles

Grand Slam tournament finals

Doubles: 2 (2 runner-ups)

Significant finals

WTA 1000 finals

Doubles: 6 (2 titles, 4 runner-ups)

WTA career finals

Doubles: 22 (12 titles, 10 runner-ups)

WTA Challenger finals

Doubles: 2 (1 title, 1 runner-up)

ITF Circuit finals

Singles: 6 (1–5)

Doubles: 33 (21–12)

Notes

References

External links
 
 

1988 births
Living people
Tennis players from Tianjin
Chinese female tennis players
Tennis players at the 2016 Summer Olympics
Olympic tennis players of China
Tennis players at the 2018 Asian Games
Medalists at the 2018 Asian Games
Asian Games medalists in tennis
Asian Games gold medalists for China
Tennis players at the 2020 Summer Olympics
21st-century Chinese women